Limosella acaulis is a species of flowering plant in the figwort family known by the common name Owyhee mudwort. It is native to western North America from the Pacific Northwest to northern Mexico, where it grows in many types of muddy habitat next to water, such as pond edges. It is a fleshy annual herb forming low mats in muddy substrate. The flattened leaves are linear to strap-shaped to spoon-shaped and up to 6 centimeters long. The inflorescence is an erect stalk bearing one white to pale lavender flower just a few millimeters wide. The fruit is a capsule up to 5 millimeters wide containing many tiny seeds.

References

External links
Jepson Manual Treatment
Photo gallery

Scrophulariaceae
Flora of Northwestern Mexico
Flora of the Northwestern United States
Flora of the Southwestern United States
Taxa named by Martín Sessé y Lacasta
Taxa named by José Mariano Mociño